A by-election was held for the Australian House of Representatives seat of Boothby on 21 February 1981. This was triggered by the resignation of Liberal Party MP John McLeay, who subsequently took up the role of Consul General in Los Angeles. It was held on the same day as by-elections for Curtin and McPherson.

This by-election was won by Steele Hall, who was Premier of South Australia from 1968 to 1970.

Key dates

Results

See also
 List of Australian federal by-elections

References

1981 elections in Australia
South Australian federal by-elections